Koteswar Rao (born 24 December 1987) is an Indian first-class cricketer who plays for Services.

References

External links
 

1987 births
Living people
Indian cricketers
Services cricketers
Cricketers from Andhra Pradesh